The Tesla turbine is a bladeless centripetal flow turbine patented by Nikola Tesla in 1913. It is referred to as a "bladeless turbine".

The Tesla turbine, also known as the boundary-layer turbine, cohesion-type turbine, and Prandtl-layer turbine, (after Ludwig Prandtl) uses the boundary-layer effect instead of a fluid upon the blades as with a conventional turbine. Bioengineering researchers have referred to it as a multiple-disk centrifugal pump.

One of Tesla's desired implementations of this turbine was for geothermal power, which he described in his work Our Future Motive Power.

Theory 

In standard steam turbines, the steam has to press on the blades for the rotor to extract energy from the speed of the steam, due to the difference between the relative speed of the steam and the blades. In the bladed steam turbine, the blades must be carefully oriented in the optimal speed regime of the turbine's work, as to minimize the angle of attack to the blade surface area. In their words, in the optimal regime, the orientation of the blades is trying to minimize the angle (blade pitch) with which the steam is hitting their surface area, as to create smooth steam flow, to try to minimize turbulence. These eddies are created in reaction to the steam impacting (although the minimized angle in the optimal turbine speed) the surface of the blades. In this dynamic, the first eddies a loss of the useful energy that can be extracted from the system, and second, as they are in opposite directions, they subtract from the energy of the incoming steam flow.

In the Tesla turbine, considering that there are no blades to be impacted, the mechanics of the reaction forces are different. The reaction force to the steam head pressure builds relatively quickly, as a steam pressure "belt" along the periphery of the turbine. That belt is most dense, and pressurized, in the periphery as its pressure, when the rotor is not under load, will be not much less than the (incoming) steam pressure. In a normal operational mode, that peripheral pressure, as Tesla noted, plays a role of BEMF (Back Electromotive Force), limiting the flow of the incoming stream, and in this way, the Tesla turbine can be said to be self-governing. When the rotor is not under load the relative speeds between the "steam compressed spirals" (SCS, the steam spirally rotating between the disks) and the disks are minimal.

When a load is applied on the Tesla turbine shaft slows down, i.e., the relative speed of the discs to the (moving) fluid increases as the fluid, at least initially, preserves its angular momentum. This is a dynamic environment, and these speeds reach these values over time delta and not instantly. Here we have to note that fluids start to behave like solid bodies at high relative velocities, and in the TT case, we also have to take into consideration the additional pressure. According to the logic, this pressure and relative velocity toward the faces of the discs, the steam should start behaving like a solid body (SCS) dragging on disk metal surfaces. The created "friction" can only lead to the generation of additional heat directly on the disk and in SCS and will be most pronounced in the peripheral layer, where the relative velocity between the metal discs and SCS discs is the highest. This increase in the temperature, due to the friction between the SCS disks and the turbine disks, will be translated to an increase in the SCS temperature, and that will lead to SCS steam expansion and pressure increase perpendicular to the metal discs as well as radially on the axis of rotation (SCS trying to expand, to absorb additional heat energy), and so this fluid dynamic model appears to be positive feedback for transmitting a stronger "dragging" on the metal disks and consequently increasing the torque at the axis of rotation.

Design 

The guiding idea for developing the Tesla turbine is the fact that to attain the highest efficiency, the changes in the velocity and direction of movement of fluid should be as gradual as possible. Therefore, the propelling fluid of the Tesla turbine moves in natural paths or streamlines of the least resistance.

A Tesla turbine consists of a set of smooth disks, with nozzles applying a moving fluid to the edge of the disk. The fluid drags on the disk through viscosity and the adhesion of the surface layer of the fluid. As the fluid slows and adds energy to the disks, it spirals into the Center exhaust. Since the rotor has no projections, it is very sturdy.

Tesla wrote: "This turbine is an efficient self-starting prime mover which may be operated as a steam or mixed fluid turbine at will, without changes in construction and is on this account very convenient. Minor departures from the turbine, as may be dictated by the circumstances in each case, will suggest themselves but if it is carried out on these general lines it will be found highly profitable to the owners of the steam plant while permitting the use of their old installation. However, the best economic results in the development of power from steam by the Tesla turbine will be obtained in plants especially adapted for the purpose."

Smooth rotor disks were originally proposed, but these gave poor starting torque. Tesla subsequently discovered that smooth rotor disks with small washers bridging the disks in about 12 to 24 places around the perimeter of a 10″ disk and a second ring of 6–12 washers at a sub-diameter made for a significant improvement in starting torque without compromising efficiency.

Efficiency and calculations 

In Tesla's time, the efficiency of conventional turbines was low because turbines used a direct drive system that severely limited the potential speed of a turbine to whatever it was driving. At the time of introduction, modern ship turbines were massive and included dozens, or even hundreds of stages of turbines, yet produced extremely low efficiency due to their low speed. For example, the turbine on Olympic and Titanic weighed over 400 tons, ran at only 165 rpm, and used steam at a pressure of only 6 psi. This limited it to harvesting waste steam from the main power plants, a pair of reciprocating steam engines. The Tesla turbine also could run on higher-temperature gasses than bladed turbines of the time, which contributed to its greater efficiency. Eventually, axial turbines were given gearing to allow them to operate at higher speeds, but the efficiency of axial turbines remained very low in comparison to the Tesla turbine.

As time went on, competing for axial turbines became dramatically more efficient and powerful, and the second stage of reduction gears was introduced in most cutting-edge U.S. naval ships of the 1930s. The improvement in steam technology gave the U.S. Navy aircraft carriers a clear advantage in speed over both Allied and enemy aircraft carriers, and so the proven axial steam turbines became the preferred form of propulsion until the 1973 oil crisis took place. It drove the majority of new civilian vessels to turn to diesel engines. Axial steam turbines still had not exceeded 50% efficiency by that time, and so civilian ships chose to use diesel engines due to their superior efficiency. By this time, the comparably efficient Tesla turbine was over 60 years old.

Tesla's design attempted to sidestep the key drawbacks of the bladed axial turbines, and even the lowest estimates for efficiency still dramatically outperformed the efficiency of axial steam turbines of the day. However, in testing against more modern engines, the Tesla turbine had expansion efficiencies far below contemporary steam turbines and far below contemporary reciprocating steam engines. It does suffer from other problems, such as shear losses and flows restrictions, but this is partially offset by the relatively massive reduction in weight and volume. Some of Tesla's turbine advantages lie in relatively low flow rate applications or when small applications are called for. The disks need to be as thin as possible at the edges in order not to introduce turbulence as the fluid leaves the disks. This translates to needing to increase the number of disks as the flow rate increases. Maximum efficiency comes in this system when the inter-disk spacing approximates the thickness of the boundary layer, and since boundary layer thickness is dependent on viscosity and pressure, the claim that a single design can be used efficiently for a variety of fuels and fluids is incorrect. A Tesla turbine differs from a conventional turbine only in the mechanism used for transferring energy to the shaft. Various analyses demonstrate that the flow rate between the disks must be kept relatively low to maintain efficiency. Reportedly, the efficiency of the Tesla turbine drops with increased load. Under light load, the spiral taken by the fluid moving from the intake to the exhaust is a tight spiral, undergoing many rotations. Under load, the number of rotations drops, and the spiral becomes progressively shorter. This will increase the shear losses and also reduce the efficiency because the gas is in contact with the discs for less distance.

The turbine efficiency (defined as the ratio of the ideal change in enthalpy to the real enthalpy for the same change in pressure) of the gas Tesla turbine is estimated to be above 60%. The turbine efficiency is different from the cycle efficiency of the engine using the turbine. Axial turbines that operate today in steam plants or jet engines have efficiencies of over 90%. This is different from the cycle efficiencies of the plant or engine, which are between approximately 25% and 42%, and are limited by any irreversibility to be below the Carnot cycle efficiency. Tesla claimed that a steam version of his device would achieve around 95% efficiency. The thermodynamic efficiency is a measure of how well it performs compared to an isentropic case. It is the ratio of the ideal to the actual work input/output.

In the 1950s, Warren Rice attempted to recreate Tesla's experiments, but he did not perform these early tests on a pump built strictly in line with Tesla's patented design (it, among other things, was not a Tesla multiple staged turbine nor did it possess Tesla's nozzle). Rice's experimental single-stage system's working fluid was air. Rice's test turbines, as published in early reports, produced an overall measured efficiency of 36–41% for a single stage. Higher efficiency would be expected if designed as originally proposed by Tesla.

In his final work with the Tesla turbine and published just before his retirement, Rice conducted a bulk-parameter analysis of model laminar flow in multiple disk turbines. A very high claim for rotor efficiency (as opposed to overall device efficiency) for this design was published in 1991 titled "Tesla Turbomachinery". This paper states:

Modern multiple-stage bladed turbines typically reach 60–70% efficiency, while large steam turbines often show turbine efficiency of over 90% in practice. Volute rotor-matched Tesla-type machines of reasonable size with common fluids (steam, gas, and water) would also be expected to show efficiencies in the vicinity of 60–70% and possibly higher.

Applications 

Tesla's patents state that the device was intended for the use of fluids as motive agents, as distinguished from the propulsion or compression of fluids (though it can also be used for those purposes). As of 2016, the Tesla turbine has not seen widespread commercial use. The Tesla pump, however, has been commercially available since 1982 and is used to pump fluids that are abrasive, viscous, shear sensitive, contain solids, or are otherwise difficult to handle with other pumps. Tesla himself did not procure a large contract for production. The main disadvantage was poor knowledge of materials characteristics and behaviors at high temperatures. The best metallurgy of the day could not prevent the turbine disks from moving and warping unacceptably during operation.

Many amateur experiments have been conducted using Tesla turbines with compressed air, or steam as the power source (the steam is generated with heat from fuel combustion or solar radiation). Disc warping has been ameliorated by using new materials such as carbon fiber.

One proposed application for the device is a waste pump, in factories and mills where normal vane-type turbine pumps typically become fouled.

Applications of the Tesla turbine as a multiple-disk centrifugal blood pump have yielded promising results due to the low peak shear force. Biomedical engineering research on such applications has continued into the 21st century.

The device functions as a pump if a similar set of disks and a housing with an involute shape (versus circular for the turbine) are used. In this configuration, a motor is attached to the shaft. The fluid enters near the center, is energized by the disks, then exits at the periphery. The Tesla turbine does not use friction in the conventional sense; precisely, it avoids it and uses adhesion (the Coandă effect) and viscosity instead. It uses the boundary-layer effect on the disc blades.

See also 

 List of Tesla patents
 Radial turbine
 Tesla coil

References

Further reading 

 Tesla, Nikola, "Dr. Tesla Talks Of Gas Turbines". Motor World. September 18, 1911.
 
 US1061206 Turbine - New and useful Improvements in Rotary Engines and Turbines
 US1329559 Valvular Conduit - Includes the Tesla gas turbine
 GB186082 Improvements in the Construction of Steam and Gas Turbines - Form of rotor
 GB186083 Economic Transformation of the Energy of Steam by Turbines - Tesla turbine system
 , Disc turbine inlet to assist self-starting, Letourneau (February 11, 2002)
 , Labyrinth seal for disc turbine, Letourneau (February 13, 2002)
 , Rotor assembly for disc turbine, Letourneau (March 15, 2002)
 , Method of and apparatus for a multi-stage boundary layer engine and process cell, Hicks (December 13, 2005)

External links 

 Vanderbilt Tesla Turbine
 Tesla turbine, from Uncle Taz Library
 Tesla Turbine Kit, Turbo-Generator, from OBI Laser Products
 Tesla Turbine featuring the work of Ken Rieli and others
 Building a Tesla turbine using hard disk platters 
 Rice, Warren, ""Tesla Turbomachinery." Proc. IV International Nikola Tesla Symposium, Sept. 23-25, 1991
 Redmond, Stephen, "Building a Disk Turbine"
 Germano, Frank D., "Tesla's Bladeless Boundary Disk Turbine and Pump" 
 Swithenbank, Alan, "The Tesla Boundary Layer Turbine"
 Peterson, Gary, Nikola Tesla's Disk Turbine Tomorrow's Gas Engine. Feed Line No. 7
 Boundary Layer Effect
 [https://www.pbs.org/tesla/ll/pv_gen_pop.html "Tesla turbine" from PBS

Inventions by Nikola Tesla
Turbines
Boundary layers
Mechanical devices using viscosity